USS Key West has been the name of three ships in the United States Navy.

, was a steamship used by the Union Navy during the American Civil War
, was a  launched in 1943 and scrapped in 1947
, is a  currently in service

See also
 , a  launched in 1943 and broken up in 1972

United States Navy ship names